"Eastern poem on the death of Pushkin" is an elegy of Azerbaijani author Mirza Fatali Akhundov, composed in 1837 in Persian. This poem was his first published work. In 1837 Akhundov prepared a Russian prose translation of his poem, and his friend Bestuzhev a versified one. First time the poem was published in the journal "Moskovskiy Telegraph" (Akhundov's translation). The poem was also published in the journal "Moskovskiĭ Nablyudatel", with an editorial note welcoming the poem as a tribute not merely to Pushkin but to Russian culture as a whole. Translation of Bestuzhev was published in 1874 in journal "Russkaya Starina". Original version of the poem was found and published only in 1936 (translator Pavel Antokolsky).

Sources

1837 poems
Azerbaijani poetry
Works by Mirza Fatali Akhundzade